Anthisnes is a municipality of Wallonia located in the province of Liège, Belgium.  

On 1 January 2006 Anthisnes had a total population of 3,998. The total area is 37.08 km² which gives a population density of 108 inhabitants per km².

The municipality consists of the following districts: Anthisnes, Hody, Tavier, and Villers-aux-Tours.

Famous inhabitants
 Marc Tarabella, mayor, member of the European Parliament.

See also
 List of protected heritage sites in Anthisnes

References

External links
 

 
Municipalities of Liège Province